Mark Burnett is a British television producer. 

Mark Burnett may also refer to:
Mark Burnett (cricketer) (born 1970), Guyanese cricketer
Mark Burnett, baseballer who played in 1999 Southeastern Conference baseball tournament
Mark Burnett, lacrosse player who played for Charlotte Copperheads
Mark Burnett Productions, owned by the British television producer